Alexander Ivanovich Tikhmenev (December 30, 1879 – April 25, 1959, Tunisia) was the military commander of the Russian Imperial and White Fleets, Rear Admiral, Chief of Staff of the Russian Squadron.

Biography
1901 – Graduated from the Marine Corps with a promotion to warrant officer.
1901–1902 – Chief of the Watch of transport «Bug».
April 30, 1903 – Chief of Watch of the cruiser «Memory of Mercury».
1904 – Graduated from the mine officer class.
1905 – Mine officer of the battleship «Three Saints».
1906–1907 – Mine officer of the battleship «Twelve Apostles» and the gunboat «Terets».
1908 – Commander of Destroyer No. 272, teacher at the mine school of the Black Sea Fleet.
1911 – Senior Lieutenant, Acting Senior Officer of the cruiser Memory of Mercury.
December 6, 1913 – Captain of the 2nd Rank for "distinction in service".
1914–1915 – Commander of the «Spooky» destroyer.
1915–1917 – Commander of the «Restless» destroyer.
1917 – Captain of the 1st Rank and commander of the battleship «Volya».
In June 1918, he took command of the Black Sea Fleet from Vice Admiral Sablin when he left for Moscow to discuss the issue of flooding the fleet.

Buried at the Borgel Cemetery in Tunis.

Distinctions
Order of Saint Stanislaus, 2nd Class with Swords;
Order of Saint Anne, 2nd Class with Swords;
Order of Saint Vladimir, 4th Class with Swords and Bow;
Turkish Medjidie Order of the 4th Class.

References

Sources

Chronos

1879 births
1959 deaths
Recipients of the Order of the Medjidie, 4th class
Deaths in Tunisia
White movement admirals